The 2nd Lithuanian Fusilier Reserve Battalion was a fusilier battalion of the Royal Prussian Army formed by Lithuanians.

1813

Formation 
Ludwig Yorck von Wartenburg marched into Königsberg on 8 January 1813 and immediately declared the mobilisation of all remaining able-bodied men. First, he called all the Krümper and recruits, which von Bülow had left to the east of the Vistula. So, Yorck created a large training camp to train the new soldiers. On March 1, seven reserve battalions were formed, which were the:

 1st East Prussian Musketeer Reserve Battalion
 2nd East Prussian Musketeer Reserve Battalion
 3rd East Prussian Musketeer Reserve Battalion
 4th East Prussian Musketeer Reserve Battalion
 1st Lithuanian Fusilier Reserve Battalion
 2nd Lithuanian Fusilier Reserve Battalion
 3rd Lithuanian Fusilier Reserve Battalion
The 2nd Lithuanian Fusilier Reserve Battalion was formed in Heilsberg. It was formed under the command of Captain von Douglas from the 4th East Prussian Infantry Regiment.

Assigning to various regiments 
After a few months, on 1 July 1813, these and other reserve battalions were concentrated into reserve regiments. Its commander von Douglas was promoted to the rank of Major on June 25. The unit retained its name until July 1.

The 2nd Lithuanian Fusilier Reserve Battalion was made the 3rd Reserve Infantry Regiment's 3rd, i.e. Fusilier, Battalion.

1815 
After Napoleon was defeated, the Prussian Army was reorganized, and so the 3rd Reserve Infantry Regiment became the 15th Infantry Regiment on 1 March 1815.

Footnotes

Sources 

Military units and formations established in 1813
Lithuanian units of the Royal Prussian Army